Charles Shepherd is an American Republican politician serving in the Idaho House of Representatives from the 7th district. He was elected to the seat after incumbent Republican Paul Shepherd, his father, decided not to run for re-election after holding the seat from 2012 to 2020. He ran unopposed in the general election.

Career

In 2021, he voted against the use of federal funds for early education, arguing that it would make it "easier for mothers to come out of the home and let somebody else raise their child, [and] I just don't think that's a good direction for us to be going."

References

External links
 Charlie Shepherd at VoteSmart

Living people
Republican Party members of the Idaho House of Representatives
21st-century American politicians
Year of birth missing (living people)